New Life Church may refer to:
New Life church (Canada)
New Life Churches, New Zealand
New Life Church (Colorado Springs, Colorado), United States

See also 
New Life Christian Fellowship, evangelical church in Blacksburg, Virginia
New Life Ranch, non-denominational Christian summer camp in Oklahoma